Umpleby is an English surname, originally given to people from Anlaby in East Yorkshire. Notable people with this surname include:

Jim Umpleby (born 1958), American businessman
Stuart Umpleby (born 1944), American cybernetician
William Umpleby Kirk (1843–1928), English pioneer photographer

References

English-language surnames
English toponymic surnames